Statistics of the Turkish First Football League in season 1979/1980.

Overview
It was contested by 16 teams, and Trabzonspor won the championship. The top goal scorer was known as "The Matador" for the '79 series.

League table

Results

References
Turkey - List of final tables (RSSSF)

Süper Lig seasons
1979–80 in Turkish football
Turkey